The Stoke-on-Trent Green Belt is a green belt environmental and planning policy that regulates the rural space throughout mainly the West Midlands region of England. It is contained within the counties of Cheshire and Staffordshire. Essentially, the function of the designated area is to prevent surrounding towns and villages within the Stoke-on-Trent conurbation from further convergence. It is managed by local planning authorities on guidance from central government.

Purpose 
The following policy was stated for the creation of the green belt area by Staffordshire County Council in 1967:

Cheshire County Council set out their policy in 1961:

Geography
The main coverage of the area is within northern Staffordshire, extending into southern Cheshire. The North West Green Belt area surrounding Macclesfield lies close to the Stoke-on-Trent green belt, being just over a mile away at its closest extent from the River Dane which forms the northern boundary for the area.

Landscape facilities and features within the green belt area include the Cudmore Fisheries, Meaford Energy Centre, Millennium Topograph in Downs Banks, JCB Harewood Estate, Rudyard Lake,  Meir Heath, Barlaston Common, Chatterley Whitfield Country Park and enterprise centre, Bucknall Reservoir, the Trent & Mersey and Caldon canals, the River Blythe and Trent, Wedgwood Museum and estate, Strongford Sewage Treatment Works, and Trent Vale Pumping Station.

A large portion of the western boundary is formed by the West Coast Main Line railway. Towns on the outer extents of the green belt include Alsager, Cheadle, Congleton, Crewe, Leek, and Stone. Towns and villages within the area include Biddulph, Endon, Kidsgrove, Rudyard, Scholar Green and Swynnerton. Due to the green belt lying across county borders, responsibility and co-ordination lies with several district councils and unitary authorities as these are the local planning authorities.

See also
 Green belt (United Kingdom)

References

External links
 Interactive map of green belt land

Green belts in the United Kingdom
Environment of Staffordshire
Environment of Cheshire
Stoke-on-Trent